Marko Šarić (born 28 November 1998) is a Serbian footballer who plays for Napredak Kruševac.

Career
He made his Serbian SuperLiga debut for FK Čukarički on 31 March 2017 in a game against Metalac. 

On 17 January 2020, Šarić joined Serbian First League club FK Radnički Pirot on loan for the rest of the season. He made seven appearances for the club and scored one goal, before returning to FK Čukarički where he was handed shirt number 11.

References

External links
 

1998 births
People from Zemun
Living people
Serbian footballers
FK Čukarički players
FK IMT players
FK Radnički Pirot players
FK Rad players
FK Metalac Gornji Milanovac players
Serbian SuperLiga players
Serbian First League players
Association football midfielders
Association football forwards